The Merrett–Murray Medal has been awarded annually since 1997, to the player adjudged the Brisbane Lions club champion over the immediately preceding Australian Football League (AFL) season. It is named after Roger Merrett and Kevin Murray. Merrett was a champion at the Brisbane Bears, while Murray was a legend at the Fitzroy Lions, the two clubs which merged to form the Brisbane Lions. The voting system, as of the 2017 AFL season, consists of the senior coach and assistant coaches scoring players based on their overall performance, influence on the game, team contribution and compliance with team values. The most votes a player can receive in a single game is twelve.

Recipients

Multiple winners

See also

Mitchell Medal – for list of  best and fairest winners from 1884–1996
Brisbane Bears Club Champion – for list of  best and fairest winners from 1987–1996

References
Generic

Specific

Australian Football League awards
Brisbane Lions
Awards established in 1997
Australian rules football-related lists